Ambernath United Atlanta Football Club, or simply Atlanta FC, is an Indian professional football club based in Mumbai, Maharashtra. It currently competes in the MFA Elite Division (top division of Mumbai Football League), and is nominated for the I-League 2nd Division.

History
Ambernath United Atlanta FC is created by a merger between Deepu K.'s Ambernath United and Allen Contractor's Atlanta FC in 2022. Atlanta FC was playing in Elite Division before the merger while Ambernath United was playing in local tournaments. Ambernath United Atlanta won the MFA Elite Division in their first year with a very dominant performance under coach Steven Dias, who was assistant coach of Odisha FC and interim coach of Jamshedpur FC, among others.

Technical staff

Women's team
Ambernath United's women team plays in MDFA Women's League, under the name Mumbai Knights FC.

Honours

Domestic league
 MFA Elite Division
 Champions (2): 2021–22, 2022–23

 Harwood Champions League
 Champions (1): 2021–22

References 

Association football clubs established in 2022
Football clubs in Mumbai
2022 establishments in Maharashtra
I-League 2nd Division clubs